is a Japanese politician. He is a member of the Democratic Party of Japan and the Vice-Speaker of the Lower House of the Diet.

Nakano was born in 1940 in Nagasaki. At age four, he experienced the atomic bombing of Nagasaki. In 1963, he graduated from the Law Department of Kansai University.

Beginning his time at university in 1960, Nakano joined the Democratic Socialist Party. After being elected three times to the Toyonaka city council, he was elected to the Diet in 1976.

In 1994, Nakano joined the New Frontier Party and served as Chair of the Policy Inquiry Commission. Upon the collapse of the party, Nakano formed the New Fraternity Party, which eventually merged with other liberal parties to form the Democratic Party of Japan. He represented the Osaka 8 electoral district until 2012, when he lost to Nippon Ishin no Kai candidate Tomohiko Kinoshita.

Note: As part of Diet custom, the Speaker and Vice-Speaker of the House must formally secede from their party. For this reason, Nakano is sometimes referred to as an independent in official Diet information. In practice he remains a member of the DPJ.

References 
 Imidas 2005 Japanese Almanac 
 Japanese Politics Central at the University of Virginia

1940 births
Living people
People from Nagasaki
Kansai University alumni
Members of the House of Representatives (Japan)
Democratic Socialist Party (Japan) politicians
New Frontier Party (Japan) politicians
20th-century Japanese politicians
Democratic Party of Japan politicians
21st-century Japanese politicians